German submarine U-667 was a Type VIIC U-boat built for Nazi Germany's Kriegsmarine for service during World War II.
She was laid down on 16 August 1941 by Deutsche Werft, Hamburg as yard number 816, launched on 29 August 1942 and commissioned on 21 October 1942 under Oberleutnant zur See Heinrich Schroeteler.

Design
German Type VIIC submarines were preceded by the shorter Type VIIB submarines. U-667 had a displacement of  when at the surface and  while submerged. She had two shafts and two  propellers.

U-667 was fitted with five  torpedo tubes (four fitted at the bow and one at the stern), fourteen torpedoes, one  SK C/35 naval gun, 220 rounds, and two twin  C/30 anti-aircraft guns. The boat had a complement of between forty-four and sixty.

Service history
The boat's career began with training at 5th U-boat Flotilla on 21 October 1942, followed by active service on 1 June 1943 as part of the 7th Flotilla for the remainder of her service.

She also cause one warship total loss.

Wolfpacks
U-667 took part in five wolfpacks, namely:
 Coronel (4 – 8 December 1943) 
 Coronel 2 (8 – 14 December 1943) 
 Coronel 3 (14 – 17 December 1943) 
 Borkum (18 – 26 December 1943) 
 Preussen (13 – 22 March 1944)

Fate
U-667 sunk on 26 August 1944 in the Bay of Biscay in position , when she struck a mine. All hands were lost.

Summary of raiding history

References

Notes

Citations

Bibliography

External links

German Type VIIC submarines
1942 ships
U-boats commissioned in 1942
Ships lost with all hands
U-boats sunk in 1944
U-boats sunk by depth charges
U-boats sunk by mines
World War II shipwrecks in the Atlantic Ocean
World War II submarines of Germany
Ships built in Hamburg
Maritime incidents in August 1944